Ustaz Justice Mohamed Rasheed Ibrahim, from the island of Fuvahmulah He also served as the Chief Justice and President of the Supreme Council for Islamic Affairs of the Maldives. He was educated from Egypt and Saudi Arabia.

References

 IBRAHIM, Mohamed Rasheed International Who's Who. accessed September 1, 2006.

Qazis of the Maldives
Living people
Year of birth missing (living people)